Xiapu (Foochow Romanized: Hà-puō) is a county in the municipal region of Ningde, Fujian, People's Republic of China, located along a stretch of East China Sea coast, with many harbours and islands.  It is bordered by Fuding City and Zherong County to the north, Fu'an City and Ningde's urban area to the west, and Luoyuan County, Fuzhou and the Matsu Islands of Lienchiang County, Republic of China (Taiwan) to the south.

Xiapu is famous among landscapes lover photographers.

Area: 
Population: 510,000
Postal code: 355100

Administration
The county executive, legislature and judiciary are in Songcheng Town, together with the CPC and PSB branches.

Xiapu has jurisdiction over 6 other towns and over 7 townships, of which three are ethnic townships designated for the native She people.

Towns
 Sansha (三沙镇)
 Yacheng (牙城镇)
 XiNan(溪南镇 and 下埔)
 Shajiang (沙江镇)
 Xiahu (下浒镇)
 Changchun (长春镇)

Townships
 Baiyang (柏洋乡)
 Beibi (北壁乡)
 Haidao
 Zhouyang (州洋乡)
 Yantian She-nation Ethnic Township (盐田畲族乡)
 Shuimen She-nation Ethnic Township (水门畲族乡)
 Chongru She-nation Ethnic Township (崇儒畲族乡)

Scenic Areas

 Yushan Island
 Xiahu Beach

Transportation
 Xiapu Railway Station on the Wenzhou-Fuzhou Railway

Xiapu Manichaean manuscripts 

In 2008 the Xiapu Manichaean manuscripts became known to the scientific world in Shangwan Village, in Baiyang Township, Xiapu County. They are manuscripts from the ancient little-practiced religion known as Manichaeism, which now only exists as Chinese Manichaeism. They continue to be used by a local priest in his Manichaean sermons. 

In comparison with the older Manichaeism and other sinicised Manichaeism, the Xiapu Manichaean texts strongly emphasize the worship of Jesus.

Xiapu in the News
In 2009 August 9, Xiapu was where Typhoon Morakot made continental landfall.  A million people had just been evacuated from vulnerable areas of this and surrounding counties.

Climate

See also 
Xiapu dialect

Notes and references

External links

 Xiapu,Fujian

County-level divisions of Fujian
Ningde